The Second Donev Government is the 98th cabinet of Bulgaria. It was appointed by President Rumen Radev on 2 February 2023.

Cabinet 

|

|
|-
|Health Minister
|Asen Medzhidiev
|Independent
|
|-
|Education Minister
|Sasho Penov
|Independent
|
|-
|Agriculture and Foods Minister
|Yavor Gechev
|BSP
|
|-
|Deputy Prime Minister for Economic Policies and Transport and Communications Minister
|Hristo Alexiev
|Independent
|
|-
|Environment and Waters Minister
|Rositsa Karamfilova-Blagova
|Independent
|
|-
|Energy Minister
|Rosen Hristov
|Independent
|
|-
|Tourism Minister
|Ilin Dimitrov
|PP
|
|-
|Economy Minister
|Nikola Stoyanov
|Independent
|
|-
|Regional Development Minister
|Ivan Shishkov
|Independent
|
|-
|Culture Minister
|Nayden Todorov
|Independent
|
|-
|Youth and Sports Minister
|Vesela Lecheva
|BSP
|
|-
|Minister of e-Government
|Georgi Todorov
|Independent
|
|-
|Minister of Innovation and Growth
|Alexander Pulev
|Independent
|
|}

References 

 
Politics of Bulgaria
Bulgaria politics-related lists
European governments
Bulgaria